The 2017–18 Middle Tennessee Blue Raiders women's basketball team represents Middle Tennessee State University during the 2017–18 NCAA Division I women's basketball season. The Blue Raiders, led by thirteenth year head coach Rick Insell, play their home games at the Murphy Center and were third year members of Conference USA. They finished the season 18–13, 10–6 in C-USA play to finish in a 4 way tie third place. They lost in the quarterfinals of the C-USA women's tournament to Rice. They received an at-large bid to the Women's National Invitation Tournament where they lost to Ball State in the first round.

Previous season
They finished the season 23–11, 15–3 in C-USA play to finish in second place. They advanced to the semifinals of the C-USA women's tournament where they lost to Southern Miss. They received an automatic bid to the Women's National Invitation Tournament where they defeated Morehead State and Wake Forest in the first and second rounds before losing to Georgia Tech in the third round.

Roster

Schedule

|-
! colspan="9" style=| Exhibition

|-
! colspan="9" style=| Non-conference regular season

|-
! colspan="9" style=| Conference USA regular season

|-
! colspan="9" style=| Conference USA Women's Tournament

|-
! colspan="9" style=| WNIT

Rankings
2017–18 NCAA Division I women's basketball rankings

See also
 2017–18 Middle Tennessee Blue Raiders men's basketball team

References

Middle Tennessee Blue Raiders women's basketball seasons
Middle Tennessee
Middle Tennessee Blue Raiders
Middle Tennessee Blue Raiders
Middle Tennessee